The 57th District of the Iowa House of Representatives in the state of Iowa.

Current elected officials
Shannon Lundgren is the representative currently representing the district.

Past representatives
The district has previously been represented by:
 Earl M. Willits, 1971–1973
 Andrew P. Varley, 1973–1979
 Virginia Poffenberger, 1979–1983
 Janis Torrence, 1983–1985
 Daniel F. Petersen, 1985–1993
 Paul Bell, 1993–2003
 Jack Drake, 2003–2013
 Nancy Dunkel, 2013–2017
 Shannon Lundgren, 2017–present

References

057